Franz Strizik (born 31 December 1953) is an Austrian weightlifter. He competed in the men's heavyweight I event at the 1980 Summer Olympics.

References

1953 births
Living people
Austrian male weightlifters
Olympic weightlifters of Austria
Weightlifters at the 1980 Summer Olympics
20th-century Austrian people